The Five Fragments, Op. 42 by Dmitri Shostakovich is a suite for small orchestra. He drafted the score in a single day, on June 9, 1935. Upon completion, the score laid unperformed until its belated premiere nearly 30 years later. It was first performed in Leningrad on April 26, 1965 by the Leningrad Philharmonic Orchestra under the direction of Igor Blazhkov.

Music
The score consists of five brief movements:

A typical performance lasts approximately 9 minutes.

Shostakovich published an article on April 11, 1935 stating that before he embarked on the "big job" of rewriting what would become the Symphony No. 4, he wanted to compose a few works of chamber and instrumental music. Among the works he contemplated writing were a string quartet and violin sonata. Instead, the only score he produced that year aside from his film music was the Five Fragments. Although the manuscript designates "Op. 43" to the score, Shostakovich later decided upon Op. 42. In a 1973 interview, Shostakovich confirmed that the music was intended as sketches for a larger work that he never embarked upon. According to Laurel Fay and Marina Frolova-Walker, the Five Fragments prefigured aspects of the Symphony No. 4, with the former calling them "preparatory work" for the larger piece.

References

 

Dmitri Shostakovich
Compositions by Dmitri Shostakovich
1935 compositions